The Blue Express or China Express is a 1929 Soviet silent drama film directed by Ilya Trauberg.

Cast
 Sergei Minin as The European 
 Igor Chernyak 
 I. Arbenin 
 Yakov Gudkin as An Overseer  
 I. Savelyev as An Overseer  
 San Bo Yan as The Girl  
 Lian Din Do as The Merchant  
 Chu Chai Wan as The Peasant  
 Chzan Kai as The Fireman 
 A. Vardul as The Coolie  
 Spasayevsky 
 Yanina Zhejmo 
 Zana Zanoni 
 Boris Brodyansky
 Chai Wan San as The General

References

Bibliography 
 Christie, Ian & Taylor, Richard. The Film Factory: Russian and Soviet Cinema in Documents 1896-1939. Routledge, 2012.

External links 
 

1929 films
Soviet silent feature films
Soviet drama films
Russian drama films
1920s Russian-language films
1929 drama films
Soviet black-and-white films
Russian silent feature films
Russian black-and-white films
Silent drama films